is a public university in Tsu, Mie, Japan.

Website

Public universities in Japan
Universities and colleges in Mie Prefecture